Rolf Nannestad (August 29, 1887 – December 15, 1969) was a Norwegian actor.

Nannestad was born in Svinør, Norway. He worked at the New Theater in the 1930s, and he was later engaged with the Norwegian Theater, People's Theater, Oslo New Theater, and Stage 7. Nannestad appeared in several films between 1938 and 1968, with his film debut in Det drønner gjennom dalen.

Filmography
 1937: Det drønner gjennom dalen as a forest worker
 1962: Tonny
 1968: Sus og dus på by'n as the tenant in the attic
 1968: De ukjentes marked as Skakkhode
 1969: Olsenbanden

References

External links
 
 Rolf Nannestad at Sceneweb
 Rolf Nannestad at Filmfront

1887 births
1969 deaths
20th-century Norwegian male actors
People from Lindesnes